Koalib (also called Kwalib, Abri, Lgalige, Nirere and Rere) is a Niger–Congo language in the Heiban family spoken in the Nuba Mountains of southern Sudan. The Koalib Nuba, Turum and Umm Heitan ethnic groups speak this language.

Dialects and locations
Koalib dialects and locations (Ethnologue, 22nd edition):
Nginyukwur dialect: Hadra, Nyukwur, and Umm Heitan
Ngirere dialect: Abri area
Ngunduna dialect: Koalib hills area
Nguqwurang dialect: Turum and Umm Berumbita

Phonology

Consonants 

 The voiced retroflex equivalent is an implosive sound [ᶑ] rather than a standard plosive [ɖ].
 Gemination occurs among plosive, nasal, liquid and approximant sounds.
 Sounds /f, t, ʃ, k, kʷ/ in intervocalic or pre-consonantal position can be heard as voiced [v, ð, ʒ, ɡ, ɡʷ]. In post-consonantal position, /f, t, ʃ, k/ are heard as [v, ð, ʒ, ɡ].
 In final position, sounds /ɟ, f/ are heard as [c, p].
 Sounds /p, t, ʈ, c, k, kʷ/ in intervocalic position can be heard as tense [pː, tː, ʈː, cː, kː, kːʷ].

Vowels

Writing system 

It is written using the Latin script, but includes some unusual letters. It shares a tailed R (Ɽ) with other Sudanese languages, and uses a letter resembling the at sign (@) for transcribing the letter ع in Arabic loanwords. The Unicode Standard includes R WITH TAIL at code points U+027D (lowercase) and U+2C64 (uppercase), but the Unicode Consortium in 2004 declined to encode the at sign separately as an orthographic letter due to lack of evidence of use.

SIL International maintains a registry of Private Use Area code points in which U+F247 represents LATIN SMALL LETTER AT, and U+F248 LATIN CAPITAL LETTER AT.

Publications
The New Testament was published in Koalib in 1967.

Footnotes

External links
 Rere Koalib basic lexicon at the Global Lexicostatistical Database

Heiban languages